Zeki Yıldırım (born 15 January 1991) is a Turkish footballer who plays as a midfielder for Altay. He made his Süper Lig debut against İstanbul B.B. on 1 September 2012.

References

External links
 
 
 
 

1991 births
Sportspeople from Antalya
Living people
Turkish footballers
Turkey B international footballers
Association football midfielders
Antalyaspor footballers
Alanyaspor footballers
Pendikspor footballers
Fatih Karagümrük S.K. footballers
Altay S.K. footballers
Süper Lig players
TFF First League players
TFF Second League players